Radio stations identifying as FM 93, 93 FM, or 93 on the FM dial, include:

 Radio Pakistan Community Broadcast Channel FM 93
 Kol Chai (FM 93 MHz), Bnei Brak, Israel
 C93FM (FM 92.9 MHz), Christchurch, New Zealand
 WWFF-FM (FM 93.3 MHz) (formerly "US 93 FM" and "The New Power 93 FM"), Alabama, U.S.
 KKBQ-FM (FM 92.9 MHz) ("The New 93Q"), Pasadena, Texas, U.S.
 KLJZ (FM 93.1 MHz) ("Z93"), Yuma, Arizona, U.S.
 KXXR (FM 93.7 MHz) ("93X"), Shoreview, Minnesota, U.S.

See also
 93.0 FM, for stations located at 93.0 MHz on the FM dial

Lists of radio stations by frequency